The United States competed at the 1998 Winter Olympics in Nagano, Japan.

With Salt Lake City as the host of the 2002 Winter Olympics, a cultural segment of the city and the state of Utah was shown at the closing ceremony.

Medalists 

The following U.S. competitors won medals at the games. In the discipline-specific sections below, medalists' names are bolded.

| width="78%" align="left" valign="top" |

| width=22% align=left valign=top |

Alpine skiing

Men

Women

Biathlon

Men

Women

Bobsleigh

Cross-country skiing

Men

Women

Curling 

Summary

Men's tournament

Team

Round-robin
Top four teams advanced to semi-finals.

Draw 1
Monday, February 9, 14:00

Draw 3
Tuesday, February 10, 19:00

Draw 5
Thursday, February 12, 9:00

Draw 7
Friday, February 13, 14:00

Draw 2
Tuesday, February 10, 9:00

Draw 4
Wednesday, February 11, 14:00

Draw 6
Thursday, February 12, 19:00

Tie-breaker 1
Friday, February 13, 19:00

Tie-breaker 2
Saturday, February 14, 9:00

Semi-final
Saturday, February 14, 18:00

Bronze medal match
Sunday, February 15, 9:00

Women's tournament

Team

Round-robin
Top four teams advanced to semi-finals.

Draw 1
Monday, February 8, 9:00

Draw 3
Tuesday, February 10, 14:00

Draw 5
Wednesday, February 11, 19:00

Draw 7
Friday, February 13, 9:00

Draw 2
Monday, February 9, 19:00

Draw 4
Wednesday, February 11, 9:00

Draw 6
Thursday, February 12, 14:00

Figure skating

Tara Lipinski became the youngest competitor in Winter Olympics history to earn a gold medal in an individual event.

Individual

Mixed

Freestyle skiing

Aerials
Men

Women

Moguls
Men

Women

Ice hockey

Summary

Men's tournament

Roster
Head coach: Ron Wilson

First round

All times are local (UTC+9).

Quarterfinal

Women's tournament

Roster
Head coach: Ben Smith

Preliminary round
The first 4 teams (shaded green) advanced to medal round games.

All times are local (UTC+9).

Gold medal game

Luge

Men

Women

Nordic combined

Short track speed skating

Men

Qualification legend: ADV – Advanced due to being impeded by another skater; FA – Qualify to medal round; FB – Qualify to consolation round.

Women

Qualification legend: FA – Qualify to medal round; FB – Qualify to consolation round.

Ski jumping

Snowboarding

Alpine
Men

Women

Freestyle
Men

Women

Speed skating

Men

Women

References

Official Olympic Reports
 Olympic Winter Games 1998, full results by sports-reference.com
 

Nations at the 1998 Winter Olympics
1998
Winter Olympics